Viorel Cataramă (born January 31, 1955, Bacău, Bacău County, Romania) is a Romanian businessman and politician who founded the furniture manufacturer Elvila in 1990. In 2019, he founded the Liberal Right Party (DL) and ran on its behalf for the 2019 Romanian presidential election where he received a very modest result, thereby by failing to qualify to the second round by a tremendous margin.

Early life

He was born in Bacău, where he attended primary school and studied at the Lucrețiu Pătrășcanu high school (currently the Gheorghe Vrânceanu National College). He graduated from the Faculty of Commerce, from the ASE in 1980. In 2004 he became a doctor in economics, title awarded by the Bucharest Academy of Economic Studies.

Personal life
He spent the first years after graduating as an economist at the Radio and TV Cassette Company in Bucharest. Since 1984 he has been an economist at Tehnoforestexport, and in 1987 he was appointed Director of the eastern Europe branch of the company BELCO.
Since 1990, he has been the President and CEO of Elvila.

Political activity 

Since 1990, he has been a member of the National Liberal Party - Aripa Tânără, and in 1990 he was appointed Secretary of State at the Ministry of Trade and Tourism, in the Petre Roman government. In 1992, he was in charge of the New Liberal Party (NPL), and in 1993, after its merger with the PNL, he became Vice President of the National Liberal Party (PNL), a position he held until 1999. 

During the 1996–2000 legislature, as senator on behalf of the PNL from Bacău, he was elected president of the Economic Commission of the Senate, the period in which numerous legislative initiatives were promoted, some of them eventually becoming laws.

Electoral history

Presidential elections

Notes 

1955 births
Living people
People from Bacău
Members of the Senate of Romania
Candidates for President of Romania
National Liberal Party (Romania) politicians
Romanian businesspeople